Polygamy was officially criminalized in Vietnam during the 1950s, with a lengthy prison sentence as punishment. Polygamy is reportedly no longer practiced in the country, though has had its roots in the past among the Hmong people. Polygamous marriages are prohibited by article 64 of the constitution, which stipulates that a lawful marriage must be monogamous.

References 

Vietnam
Society of Vietnam
Hmong culture